Echiomima is a genus of moths of the family Xyloryctidae.

Species
 Echiomima fabulosa Meyrick, 1915
 Echiomima mythica (Meyrick, 1890)
 Echiomima viperina Meyrick, 1915

References

Xyloryctidae
Xyloryctidae genera